Mohd Hezry Mohd Hafidz (born 7 July 1984) better known by his stage name AG Coco, is a Malaysian record producer, songwriter and lead guitarist of the rock band Hujan.

Born and raised in Kedah, Hezry first became known as a lead guitarist for rock band Hujan in the late 2000s, producing singles for recording artists such as Yuna, Tomok and Hafiz. He also led as orchestra conductor for local television productions and competition television series.

Early life 

Hezry was born on 7 July 1984 in Alor Setar, Kedah. He was raised in a middle-class background, attending Sekolah Maktab Al-Maahad Al-Mahmud. In his early years, he was introduced to bass and bought a secondhand RM300 drum kit with an agreement with his mother to get a good score for his examination in return for the drum sponsorship. His first band, D'Relax participated in the local competition battle of the bands in Kedah/Perlis region and won first place in the gig as drummer of the band. Later, he and other members of five different bands post-competition formed Coco (Combination Of Creative Obsessions). Recording company soon interested in Coco band and eventually signing them as recording artist in 2003.

Originally known as Akademi Seni Kebangsaan (ASK), but renamed to Akademi Seni Budaya dan Warisan Kebangsaan (ASWARA) in 2006, was where Hezry expanded his musical knowledge mainly in jazz. For his weekly performance evaluation there, instead of just performing with the academy student, he brought Hujan, an outsider group to perform according to what his lecturer had taught him by performing Pagi Yang Gelap. He first encountered Noh Salleh in Myspace knowing that Noh's songs could take off in the local music industry.

Kamar Seni Recording Studio was established in 2009. Initially, his family was against his musical career in the beginning because of social stigma of musicians cannot support themselves. His recording studio has been producing multiple local recording artists and local television music shows.

Discography

Writing credits 

Hujan

 1, 2, 3, Go! (2007)
 Check Check Rock Rock (2007)
 Hujan (2008)
 Mencari Konklusi (2009)
 Lonely Soldier Boy (2010)
 Sang Enemy (2012)
 Jika Sempat (2016)
 Suria (2018)
 Pelangi Dan Kau (2020)

Yuna

 Terukir Di Bintang (2012)
 Lelaki (2013)

Coco
 Kombinasi (2003)
 Mengintai ke Langit (2006)
 Hey You (2009)

Astro
 P. Ramlee: Satu Indiepretasi (2011)
 Ada Imam dikalangan Kita
 Aku Sudirman

Film scores 

Shorts film
 Adik (directed by Fazryl Samad)
 Kampung Bangsar (directed by Sharifah Amani)
 Hawa (directed by Sharifah Amani)
 Terbang (directed by Hisham Salleh & Linus Chung)
 Blessings (directed by Hisham Salleh & Linus Chung)
 DYA (directed by Faidzal Annuar)

Feature film
 Impak Maksima (Excellent Film)
 Anak Jantan (Grand Brilliance)

Concert tours 

 Fantasia Music Tour (2004)
 Kugiran Hujan Ke United Kingdom (2007)
 Check Check Rock Rock Tour Hujan (2007)
 Mencari Konklusi Tour (2009)
 Hujan & Search Europe Tour (2011)
 Festival Muzika Melbourne Australia (2012)
 Yuna Homecoming Tour (2013)
 Hujan London Tour (2016)

Achievements  

 Nominees for the best music arranger / best rock album / best song / best rock song / best album in AIM 18, 19 & AIM20.
 Won the Best rock song &rock album in AIM18 with Hujan & Best Song, & Best Pop Song AIM20 for Lelaki with Yuna & Best Album AIM20 with Hafiz Suip.
 Finalist Anugerah Juara Lagu AJL24,25. judging for AJL 26. guest performance on AJL 24 & 27.
 Juara AJL 27 for Terukir Di Bintang YUNA.
 AJL26 & AIM20 Judges.
 Committee of RANtAi Art Event.
 Malaysia Delegates for MIDEM Conference in Cannes, France 2013.
 Juara Versus 2012 ( 1st season ) with Hujan.
 Touring with Hujan through globe; United Kingdom / Europe / Indonesia /
 Music Director & Music Instructor for IDOLA KECIL 6 & IDOLA ALL STARS TV9.
 CEO & Director of Kamar Seni Recording Studio.

References

External links
 

1984 births
Living people
Malaysian musicians
People from Kedah